The Turbo Encabulator (later the Rockwell Retro Encabulator and SANS ICS HyperEncabulator) is a fictional electromechanical machine with a satirical technobabble description that became a famous in-joke amongst engineers after it was published by the British Institution of Electrical Engineers in their Students' Quarterly Journal in 1944. Technical documentation has been written for the non-existent machine, and there are a number of parody marketing videos.

History

An early popular American reference to the turbo encabulator appeared in an article by New York lawyer Bernard Salwen in the April 15, 1946, issue of Time magazine. Part of Salwen's job was to review technical manuscripts, including an Arthur D. Little Industrial Bulletin which had reprinted Quick's piece, and he was amused enough by it to include the description in his article.

In response to a letter printed in the May 6 issue of Time from W. E. Habig of Madison, N.J. asking "What is a 'dingle arm'?”, the editors described it as "An adjunct to the turbo-encabulator, employed whenever a barescent skor motion is required." A month later a response to reader mail on the feature appeared in the June 3, 1946 issue:

In 1962 a turboencabulator data sheet was created by engineers at General Electric's Instrument Department, in West Lynn, Massachusetts. It quoted from the previous sources and was inserted into the General Electric Handbook. The turboencabulator data sheet had the same format as the other pages in the G.E. Handbook.  The engineers added "Shure Stat" in "Technical Features", which was peculiar only to the Instrument Department, and included the first known graphic representation of a "manufactured" Turboencabulator using parts made at the Instrument Department.

Circa 1977, Bud Haggart, an actor who appeared in many industrial training films in and around Detroit, performed in the first film realization of the description and operation of the turbo encabulator, using a truncated script adapted from Quick's article. Haggart convinced director Dave Rondot and the film crew to stay after the filming of an actual GMC Trucks project training film to realize the turbo encabulator spot.

Another version was done by Mike Kraft who had previously worked with Bud Haggart and known as the "retro encabulator" using an Allen-Bradley motor control center and referencing other brands owned by Rockwell Automation.  This version was put online and made its way to eBaum’s World where it gained quite a bit of notoriety.

The term, in both textual and video format, has continued to appear in newer media.  For example, Mike Kraft was asked to do a film explaining the fictional "hyper encabulator".

Significance 
The case of turbo encabulator has become a humorous example of obfuscation by excessive jargon in the fields of science and engineering. The term has been used as a classic example of technobabble.

See also 
 Blinkenlights
 Interocitor
 Thiotimoline
 Unobtainium
 Write-only memory (joke)
 Widget (economics)

References

External links
Reprint of original article by Arthur D. Little

Selected videos 
First four presented by Bud Haggart.
Turbo Encabulator, original filmed version
Chrysler Turbo Encabulator
Chrysler Turbo Encabulator, new version
Rockwell Turbo Encabulator
Rockwell Retro Encabulator
SANS ICS Hyper Encabulator (also uses Mike Kraft who was the narrator in the Rockwell Retro Encabulator video)

Tech humour
Fictional objects
Fictional technology
Humorous hoaxes in science
Hoaxes in the United States
1940s hoaxes
In-jokes